Maxime Paul (born 26 March 1971) is a French yacht racer who competed in the 1992 Summer Olympics.

References

1971 births
Living people
French male sailors (sport)
Olympic sailors of France
Sailors at the 1992 Summer Olympics – 470
Place of birth missing (living people)